The Central Financial and Economic Affairs Commission is a commission of the Central Committee of the Chinese Communist Party in charge of leading and supervising economic work of both the CCP Central Committee and the State Council. The Commission is generally headed by CCP General Secretary or Premier of the State Council.

It is currently led by General Secretary Xi Jinping, with Premier Li Qiang as its deputy leader. The Commission coordinates closely with the National Development and Reform Commission and is considered the highest body for coordination and discussion on issues related to the economy. The Office of the Commission, handling the daily affairs of the body, is currently headed by Liu He.

History 
The Commission was originally established as the Central Leading Group for Financial and Economic Affairs on March 1980. The decision to establish this group was taken by the CCP Politburo Standing Committee on March 17, 1980 to replace the State Commission for Economy and Finance, so as to coordinate the work necessary to meet the requirements of Deng Xiaoping's "Reform and Opening Up" policy.

In March 2018, the leading group was transformed into the Central Financial and Economic Affairs Commission.

Leaders 
 Zhao Ziyang (1980–1989, as Premier then General Secretary)
 Jiang Zemin (1989–2003, as General Secretary)
 Hu Jintao (2003–2013, as General Secretary)
 Xi Jinping (2013–present, as General Secretary)

Current composition
Leader
Xi Jinping, General Secretary of the Chinese Communist Party, President of the People's Republic of China
Deputy Leader
Li Keqiang, Politburo Standing Committee, Premier of the People's Republic of China
Chief of General Office
Liu He
Members
Liu Yunshan, Politburo Standing Committee, Secretary of the Central Secretariat (ranked first)
Zhang Gaoli, Politburo Standing Committee, Vice-Premier
Liu Yandong, Politburo, Vice-Premier
Wang Yang, Politburo, Vice-Premier
Ma Kai, Politburo, Vice-Premier
Wang Huning, Politburo, CCP Policy Research Office chief
Li Zhanshu, Politburo, CCP General Office chief
Yang Jiechi, State Councilor in charge of Foreign Affairs
Yang Jing, Secretary-General of the State Council, Secretary of the Central Secretariat
Zhou Xiaochuan, Governor of the People's Bank of China
Fang Fenghui, PLA Chief of General Staff
Xiao Jie, Deputy Secretary-General of the State Council
Xu Shaoshi, Director of the National Development and Reform Commission
Miao Wei, Minister of Industry and Information Technology
Jiang Daming, Minister of Land and Resources
Chen Lei, Minister of Water Resources
Wang Yi, Minister of Foreign Affairs
Wang Zhigang, Deputy Minister of Science and Technology
Lou Jiwei, Minister of Finance
Zhou Shengxian, Minister of Environmental Protection
Yang Chuantang, Minister of Transport
Wu Xinxiong, Director of the National Energy Administration

References

Citations

Sources 

 Xu, Dashen. Records of the People's Republic of China. Jilin People's Publishing House, 1994.

Politburo of the Chinese Communist Party
1980 establishments in China